Vaidotai railway station is a Lithuanian Railways station in Vilnius. It is the main cargo transit station in Lithuania.

Vaidotai railway station was built in order to reduce cargo transactions in Vilnius railway station and Paneriai railway station. It is connected with Vilnius-Vaidotai-Paneriai railway circle. It also has connections with Belarus, Ukraine and local detour through Nemėžis and Kyviškės.

Vilnius Intermodal Terminal, the first dry port in Lithuania, was built next to the Vaidotai railway station.

References 

Railway stations in Vilnius